is a Japanese highway on the island of Kyushu. It originates at the intersection with Route 2 in Kitakyushu, Furoka and passes through the prefectural capitals of Ōita and Miyazaki, terminating at the intersection with Route 3 in Kagoshima. Route 10 follows the eastern coast along the Inland Sea and the Hyūga Sea. For much of its length, it parallels the JR Kyushu Nippō Main Line. Route 10 measures 454.8 km in length.

Route data
Length: 
Origin: Moji-ku, Kitakyushu (originates at junction with Route 2)
Terminus: Kagoshima (ends at Junction with Routes 3 and 225)
Major cities: Kitakyushu, Ōita, Miyazaki, Miyakonojō, Kagoshima

History
4 December 1952 - First Class National Highway 10 (from Kitakyushu to Kagoshima)
1 April 1965 - General National Highway 10 (from Kitakyushu to Kagoshima)

Overlapping sections
From Moji-ku, Kitakyushu (Oimatsu-Park intersection) to Kokurakita-ku, Kitakyūshū (Mihagino intersection): Route 3
From Kokurakita-ku, Kitakyūshū (Mihagino intersection) to Kokuraminami-ku, Kitakyūshū (Jōno intersection): Route 322
From Nakatsu to Usa (Iwasaki intersection) and from Hiji (Hori intersection) to Beppu: Route 213
From Oita (Omichi Cross Bridge North intersection) to Bungo-Ōno Inukai-machi Kubaru (Kubaru intersection): Route 57
From Oita (Funai Bridge North intersection) to Oita (Miyazaki intersection): Route 210
From Usuki (Notsu-machi Hinata Crossroad intersection) to Usuki (Notsu-machi Meiji Bridge intersection): Route 502
From Nobeoka Kitagawa-machi Kawachimyō (Sodachi intersection) to Nobeoka Showa-machi: Route 326
From Nobeoka Okado-machi to Kadogawa Nakasu: Route 388
From Miyazaki (Niinazume intersection) to Miyazaki (Tachibana-dori 4 Chome intersection): Route 219
From Miyakonojō (Miyakonojō Station Entrance intersection) to Miyakonojō (Oiwada intersection): Route 269
From Kirishima Fukuyama-cho Fukuyama (Makinohara intersection) to Kirishima Hayato Shinkō (junction with Route 223): Route 504

Municipalities passed through
Fukuoka Prefecture
Kitakyushu - Kanda - Yukuhashi - Miyako (part of ‘Shiida Toll Road’ Bypass section) - Chikujō - Buzen - Kōge 
Ōita Prefecture
Nakatsu - Usa - Kitsuki - Hiji - Beppu - Ōita - Bungo-Ōno - Usuki - Saiki
Miyazaki Prefecture
Nobeoka - Kadogawa - Hyūga - Tsuno - Kawaminami - Takanabe - Shintomi - Miyazaki - Miyakonojō
Kagoshima Prefecture
Soo - Kirishima - Aira - Kagoshima

See also

References

010
Roads in Fukuoka Prefecture
Roads in Kagoshima Prefecture
Roads in Miyazaki Prefecture
Roads in Ōita Prefecture